Gaudion is a surname. Notable people with the surname include:

 Charlie Gaudion (1904–1979), Australian rules footballer 
 Frank Gaudion (1882–1952),  Australian rules footballer 
 Jack Gaudion (1910–1993), Australian rules footballer 
 Marcel Gaudion (1924–2021), French handball player
 Michael Gaudion (1938–2021), Australian rules footballer 
 Phil Gaudion, Australian professional drummer